Pickering—Ajax—Uxbridge was a provincial electoral district in central Ontario, Canada that elected one Member of the Legislative Assembly of Ontario. It was created in 1999 from Durham West and Durham—York. It was abolished in 2007 with the territory rolled into Ajax—Pickering, Durham and Pickering—Scarborough East.

The riding included all of Pickering and Uxbridge plus all of Ajax north of Finch Avenue.

Members of Provincial Parliament
Janet Ecker, Ontario Progressive Conservative Party (1999–2003)
Wayne Arthurs, Ontario Liberal Party (2003–2007)

Election results

Former provincial electoral districts of Ontario